Thennavan is an Indian actor who has appeared in supporting roles. After making his debut in Bharathiraja's En Uyir Thozhan (1990), the actor was recognised for his work in Gemini (2002) Virumaandi (2004) and Jay Jay (2003).

Career
After graduating from Sarvajana High School, Coimbatore in 1984, Thennavan moved to Chennai to pursue a career in films. Thennavan made his acting debut in Bharathiraja's 1990 film En Uyir Thozhan, portraying a secondary lead role. He won critical acclaim for his performance as Kai in Saran's Gemini (2002), and has since been credited in films as Kai Thennavan. Playing a sidekick to Vikram's titular character, The Hindu gave him a positive review writing "he does a convincing job" and "his penetrating stare takes care of the expressions." The success of the film, saw Kamal Haasan pick him to play a role in Virumaandi, for which he also received positive reviews.

Thennavan then played the lead role in an experimental film, Ayul Regai (2005), winning critical acclaim for his portrayal of a man on the verge of depression. A critic praised his contribution to the film, noting with "a wiry frame, unkempt hair and large eyes, he fits the role perfectly." He has since been seen in supporting roles in films including Sundarapandian (2012) and Naan Than Bala (2014).

Filmography

Television

References

External links
 

Living people
Male actors from Tamil Nadu
Male actors in Tamil cinema
1966 births
People from Coimbatore